Ragdoll is a 1999 American horror film directed by Ted Nicolaou. The film was later edited into a thirty-minute short entitled Voodoo Doll for the horror anthology Devil Dolls.

Plot

A talented teenage rapper named Kwame uses his Grandmother's ancient voodoo (magic of the killing kind) to help him in his revenge against the sadistic crime boss trying to extort his group, after he and his two brothers put her in the hospital. He summons the dark spirit known as the Shadow Man, to kill the criminal and his brothers. When the Shadow Man asks Kwame what he will pay, Kwame says that he will promise him any thing, except his Grandmother, or the deal is off.

The Shadow Man uses magic to give life to an old ragdoll, and sends it to kill. Kwame soon learns that with each death of his enemies, the ragdoll then kills someone he cares about. When his girlfriend, Tisha, is targeted, his Grandmother uses her magic to secretly trade places with Tisha. When the ragdoll comes and kills her, it breaks the deal with the Shadow Man, as Kwame said his Grandmother could not be harmed. Though Tisha is safe , Kwame can only mourn for his dead friends and Grandmother.

Cast

 Russell Richardson as Kwame
 William L. Johnson as Gene
 Jennifer Echols as Woman Detective
 Derrick Jones as Man
 Rick Michaels as Second Detective
 Freda Payne as Gran
 Jay Williams as Emcee
 Rejjie Jones as Third Detective
 Jennia Fredrique as Teesha
 Tarnell Poindexter as Little Mikey 
 William Stanford Davis as Pere
 Danny Wooten as Gem
 Troy Medley as Louis
 Frederic Tucker as Shadow Man
 Lamar Haywood as Agent
 Jemal McNeil as Bartender 
 Renee O'Neil as Sylvie

Production
The film was originally announced in 1992, but it did not begin pre-production until 1999.  Charles Band stated that rumors that Paramount had shut down production of the film were untrue; he chose not to shoot the film, as he felt that it needed more time to develop.

Release
Big City Records, a music label owned by Full Moon, released an associated soundtrack, Ragdoll: Music Inspired By The Motion Picture.  This was the label's first release.

Reception
Dread Central thought highly of the edited version of the film for Devil Dolls, writing "here’s a halfway decent story here and some enjoyably hammy acting bolstering it".

References

External links
 

1999 films
Puppet films
1999 direct-to-video films
Films about sentient toys
Direct-to-video horror films
Films directed by Ted Nicolaou
Sentient toys in fiction
1990s English-language films